Azmizam bin Zaman Huri is a Malaysian politician from the People's Justice Party (PKR), a component party of the Pakatan Harapan (PH) coalition who currently as member of Selangor State Assembly for Pelabuhan Klang since May 2018.

Election results

References

External links 
 

Living people
1973 births
People from Selangor
Malaysian people of Malay descent
Malaysian Muslims
People's Justice Party (Malaysia) politicians
Members of the Selangor State Legislative Assembly
21st-century Malaysian politicians